The Nightshift is a Scottish overnight regional television programme broadcast on STV in Northern and Central Scotland. The overnight strand initially began as a local six-week pilot programme in the STV Central region on Thursday 22 April 2010, before launching a second edition for the STV North region on Tuesday 13 July 2010.

The service, broadcast live every night from STV's transmission control centre at Pacific Quay in Glasgow, features highlights of archived STV programmes, reports from STV News at Six, showbiz news items and archive aerial footage of Scotland, as well as texts & e-mails read out live on air by an out-of-vision presenter.

On Tuesday 12 April 2011, a separate edition of The Nightshift began airing in each of STV's four sub-regional areas used for news opt-outs and local advertising:
Glasgow and West Central Scotland
Edinburgh and East Central Scotland
Aberdeen, the North East, Highlands and Islands
Dundee, Tayside and North East Fife

The sub-regional programmes were axed in October 2011 and replaced with a single pan-regional edition serving both of the Northern and Central areas, with opt-outs for regional news. In December 2011, the programme was cut from seven to four nights a week, airing on Thursday - Sunday nights.

The programme returned to airing every night in February 2014, broadcasting from midnight or thereabouts until 5am, but was cut again to weekends only four months later. The Nightshift ended its original run on Wednesday 1 July 2015, but returned for a brief run from Thursday 27 August to Thursday 1 October 2015.

Presenters

Laura Boyd (relief)
Tam Cowan
Adele Cunningham
Liam Dolan
Karen Dunbar
Alan Edwards
Gina McKie
Donny Hughes
Laura Keenan
Hayley Matthews
Gary Marshall
Scottie McClue
Derek McIntyre
Cameron McKenna 
Des McLean
Angela Morton (producer)
Josie Smith
Jim Symon
Ravi Sagoo
Shereen Tulloch

References

2010 British television series debuts
2015 British television series endings
English-language television shows
Scottish television shows
Television series by STV Studios